Songs My Mother Taught Me may refer to:

Books
 Songs My Mother Taught Me, Audrey Thomas 1973
 Songs My Mother Taught Me (Marlon Brando book), an autobiography by Marlon Brando
 Songs My Mother Taught Me, a collection of stories and plays by Wakako Yamauchi

Music
 "Songs My Mother Taught Me" (Dvořák), "Když mne stará matka"  from Ciganské melodie (Gypsy Melodies), Op.55 - No. 4
 "Songs My Mother Taught Me" (Charles Ives song)

Albums
 Songs My Mother Taught Me (Joan Sutherland album), an album by Joan Sutherland
 Songs My Mother Taught Me, album by Lorna Luft
 Songs My Mother Taught Me, album by Magdalena Kožená: Songs by J.J. Rösler, A. Dvořák, V. Novák, L. Janáček, B. Martinů, E. Schulhoff and P. Eben.